is a Japanese funk rock band. Their name is an acronym for "Break the Rule And Do Image On" and means that they will break the rules of everyday life, and while having a wonderful image all around, they will make a new good place. The members call their fans Funky Party People (FPP).

History 
In 2010, The Movie Archives' Takaaki Shingyoji and Yuki Tanabe formed BRADIO with Soichi Ohyama (ex-Gold End), Ryosuke Sakai (ex-Gold End), and Takahiro Kitazawa (ex-Awesome Dude). That same year in December, they released their first demo and played in their first live concert. In April 2012, they released their second demo. In June 2012, Takahiro left the band and they were left with the current line up.

They signed with D&S Records and released their first mini album, Diamond Pops, in October 2013. Bradio released their second mini-album, Swipe Times, in July 2014 under Hero Music Entertainment. Their first single "Otona Hit Parade/Step In Time" was released in November 2014.  At the beginning of 2015, their single, "Flyers", was used as the opening theme song for the anime Death Parade.

On June 3, 2015, Bradio released their first full-length album, Power of Life. Their single "Hotel Alien", released on November 11, 2015, was used as the opening of the anime Peeping Life Season 1.

Their first ballad single "Gift" was released on June 1, 2016. The single is used to expressed how to say thank you for all children to their mothers. The second track, "Bring it on", is used in the Square Enix game Rungun-Cannonball for smartphones.

Their single "Back to the Funk" was released on November 11, 2016. Their second album, Freedom, was released on January 18, 2017.

Their first major single "La pa Paradise" was released on October 11, 2017. This single is the first major single after they moved to the Warner Music Japan label.

On January 15, 2018, Bradio announced on their website, that drummer Yuki Tanabe will leave the band.

Bradio performed internationally for the first time at A-Kon 2018 in Fort Worth, Texas. They returned to the United States to perform at Otakon in Washington, D.C. on July 24, 2019.

They released their third album, and their major-label debut YES on July 4, 2018, and their fourth album Joyful Style on April 21, 2021. They will release their 5th album, Dancehall Magic, on May 3, 2023.

Band members 
Current members
  — lead vocal (2010–present)
  — guitar, vocals (2010–present)
  — bass, vocals (2010–present)

Former members
  — guitar (2010–2012)
  — drums, vocals (2010–2018)

Timeline

Discography

Studio albums

Mini albums

Singles

Notes

References

External links 
  
 BRADIO discography on iTunes

Funk rock musical groups
Japanese rock music groups
Warner Music Japan artists
Musical groups established in 2010
2010 establishments in Japan